MYSTIC is a former secret program used since 2009 by the US National Security Agency (NSA) to collect the metadata as well as the content of phone calls from several countries. The program was first revealed in March 2014, based upon documents leaked by Edward Snowden.

MYSTIC operates under the legal authority of Executive Order 12333.

History 

The MYSTIC program started in 2009, but reached its full capability to record the content of phone calls in an entire country for 30 days, in 2011. Documents from 2013 say the surveillance program could be extended to other countries.

On March 18, 2014, the existence of the program was first revealed by The Washington Post, based upon documents leaked by Edward Snowden. It was reported that the NSA had the capability to record all the phone calls from an unidentified foreign country.

On May 19, 2014, the website The Intercept published the name of one country of which the phone calls were recorded, and also identified three other countries of which only the telephony metadata were collected (see below).

Scope 

Under a sub-program of MYSTIC codenamed SOMALGET, the NSA is actively recording and archiving the content of "virtually every" phone call for thirty days. After thirty days, the recorded calls are overwritten by newer phone calls, although concern was raised that the NSA may start storing collected phone calls indefinitely.

Although NSA analysts can only listen to less than 1% of the phone calls collected under MYSTIC, millions of voice clips are forwarded for processing and storage every month.

A representative of the American Civil Liberties Union (ACLU) criticized the program, stating that the NSA now has the ability to record anything it wants to. It was also noted that MYSTIC is the first revealed NSA surveillance operation capable of monitoring and recording an entire nation's telecommunication system.

Targets 

As of 2013, the NSA collected the metadata of phone calls from five entire countries, according to a report by The Intercept from May 19, 2014: Mexico, the Philippines, Kenya, the Bahamas and an initially unidentified country.

For the latter two countries, the NSA not only collected the metadata, but also the content of phone calls. This took place under the SOMALGET sub-program.

The NSA documents purport that unlawful mass surveillance of the Bahamas resulted in the apprehension of narcotics traffickers. The US government has also not yet shared information with the Bahamas, despite indicating that it would.

Afghanistan 
In March 2014, former NSA Deputy Director John C. Inglis had already said that the other country was Iraq, but on May 19, an analysis published on the website Cryptome identified the country as Afghanistan. Several days later, on May 23, WikiLeaks also reported that Afghanistan was the country of which the NSA collected nearly all phone calls.

On September 9, 2015, US Director of National Intelligence James Clapper said that the disclosure of what reporters believed to be the MYSTIC and/or SOMALGET program, led the Afghan government to immediately close down an important intelligence program, that "was the single most important source of force protection and warning for our people in Afghanistan", according to Clapper.

See also 

 Global surveillance disclosures (2013–present)
 List of government mass surveillance projects

References

Mass surveillance
National Security Agency operations
Intelligence agency programmes revealed by Edward Snowden